Caherconlish is a village in County Limerick, Ireland.

Location
The village of Caherconlish is located 16 km southeast of Limerick City in east County Limerick. It is one half of the parish of Caherconlish/Caherline in the Roman Catholic Archdiocese of Cashel and Emly. The village's fairly close proximity to Limerick City has meant a growth in both the size and population of the village, as Caherconlish is now seen as a commuter town of the city. Neighbouring villages include Boher, Ballyneety, Herbertstown, Kilteely and Pallasgreen.

The main focal point is the Millennium Centre.

Sport
The main sports played in the village are hurling, gaelic football and soccer.

Caherline GAA is the local hurling club and they play in blue and white. The club is a member of the east division of Limerick GAA and has won the Limerick Senior Hurling Championship on three occasions in 1896,1905 and 1907. Their biggest achievement in recent times was winning the Limerick Junior Hurling Championship for the fourth time in their history in 2021. Their grounds are Father Hayes Memorial Park on the Mitchelstown road.

The Gaelic football club in the parish is called Caherconlish GAA and they play in blue, black and white. They too play at Father Hayes Memorial Park.

Caherconlish AFC is the local soccer club in the village. The club playing colours are Amber/Yellow and Green.
The club consists of 188 players, 166 underage and 23 adult players (as of 2021). The club plays in the Limerick District School Boy league (underage) and Limerick District league (Adult). The club is located at Caherconlish AFC grounds adjacent to Oakley Lawns Residential Estate.

People
 Nóirín Ní Riain, singer

See also
 List of towns and villages in Ireland

References

External links

Towns and villages in County Limerick